Lutibacter litorisediminis is a Gram-negative, aerobic, rod-shaped and non-motile bacterium from the genus of Lutibacter which has been isolated from tidal flat from Oido in Korea.

References

Flavobacteria
Bacteria described in 2017